Vida (Life) is the twelfth studio album by Puerto Rican recording artist Draco Rosa, released on March 19, 2013 by Sony Music Latin. It consists of 16 duets of Rosa's hits featuring guest artists chosen personally by Rosa himself. This is the first album released by Draco after his non-hodgkin lymphoma cancer diagnosis near his liver on April 25, 2011. It is entitled Vida symbolizing Draco's recovery after his cancer treatment. The album won Album of the Year at the 2013 Latin Grammy Awards and Best Latin Pop Album at the 56th Annual Grammy Awards.

Background
On April 25, 2011, Draco Rosa was diagnosed with cancer near his liver. While undergoing treatment, Rosa announced in December 2011 that he was preparing a new album that would feature collaborations with Latin music artists such as Alejandro Sanz, Juan Luis Guerra, Enrique Bunbury, and Calle 13. One of the most notable artists he selected for his album was fellow ex-Menudo member and long-time friend Ricky Martin. In September 2012, he confirmed the title of album Vida which features various Latin artists performing duets with him with songs from his music career. The songs he picked for the record were inspirational tracks about life.

Duets
The first track "Esto Es Vida" features Dominican singer-songwriter Juan Luis Guerra which Rosa first recorded for his album Amor Vincit Omnia (2009). Four other songs from the album: "El Tiempo Va", "Obra de Arte", "Paraíso Prometido (Hay Que Llegar)" and "Reza Por Mí", features Rubén Blades, Enrique Bunbury, Marc Anthony, and Romeo Santos, respectively. With no direct promotion for the duet with Ednita Nazario, "Amantes Hasta El Fin" entered the Billboard's Latin Airplay chart in November 2014 with 3.2 million audience impressions, according to Nielsen, after over a year and a half since the release of the album.

Release
On October 16, 2012, Draco's manager and friend Angelo Medina announced that the album's release date had been pushed back from November 13, 2012 to February 2013 due to Rosa entering quarantine after a bone marrow transplant months before. After completing his quarantine on December 31, 2012, Draco was declared cancer-free. A final statement was released on January 10, 2013, announcing that the official release date of Vida had been pushed back an additional month, for March 19, 2013.

In an interview with Draco, he said: "For me this album's been a wonderful experience. In difficult times, the music, the love and support of the public and all partners involved in this project has been a source of life and inspiration. It was intense working hours at complex moments with very much solidarity, emotion and hope. I'm really excited and grateful to everyone who helped make this dream possible. For me, this album's been a wonderful experience. Music in difficult times, the love and support of the public and all partners involved in this project has been an inspiration and source of life".

Sony Music Latin issued a statement on March 12, 2013, announcing that Vida was to be released in Spain on April 9. The statement also included the official track list of the album.

Vida was recorded in Spain, England, Mexico, Argentina, United States and Puerto Rico.

Track listing
On May 11, 2012, the full set of collaborations was released to the press and on March 12, 2013, the official track list order was released, a week before the album's release.

Promotion

In-stores and TV appearances
Draco held a five-day in-store tour throughout Puerto Rico, March 20–24, 2013, in Cantón Mall in Bayamón, Mayagüez, Caguas, Hatillo and Plaza Las Américas in Hato Rey. Draco later promoted Vida in Chicago with in-stores, and television interviews where he expressed his gratitude to the fans for making the album number one in Billboard's Top Latin Albums. Rosa continued to promote the album in Miami as well, where he performed at the 2013 Billboard Latin Music Awards with Maná.

Live performances
The first live performance of the album took place on February 21, 2013 at Premios Lo Nuestro, held at the American Airlines Arena, where Draco and Ricky Martin performed their single "Más y Más", their first public performance together since they were both in Menudo. They performed the single again at the 2013 Latin Grammy Awards, held at the Mandalay Bay Events Center on November 21, 2013. Draco and Mexican band Maná performed "Penélope" at the 2013 Billboard Latin Music Awards, held at the BankUnited Center on April 25, 2013.

Music videos
As part of the new projects, Draco and Ricky participated together in the recording of the single's music video in New York under the direction of Carlos Pérez. On January 14, 2013 Ricky Martin tweeted a photo of him and Draco with the caption "At the music video shoot of #MasYMas with my brother @dracorosa. #Vida". The music video was released on Draco's YouTube channel on February 13, 2013. The music video for the obscure version of "Más y Más" was filmed at Phantom Vox Studios in Los Angeles in front of a small but intimate public and directed by Angela Alvarado, then-wife of Draco. After making a special appearance at Alejandro Sanz's concert in Puerto Rico on May 12, 2013, in which they sang their duet of "Como Me Acuerdo", Draco and Sanz's performance was filmed and used for its music video released on October 21, 2013, but was removed from YouTube the same day.

After making his first ever appearance at the Puerto Rican Day Parade on June 9, 2013 and performing at the Copacabana in Times Square on May 11, 2013, Draco confirmed that he will film the music video for duet of "Esto Es Vida" with Juan Luis Guerra in the Dominican Republic which he appraised during his illness as one of his "best compositions". "It was a strong moment in my life. They're important parts with serious people, important", he expressed. Filming took place on June 17, 2013 at the ruins of the Engombe Sugar Mill in Santo Domingo. The video was directed by Guerra's own son, filmmaker Jean Gabriel Guerra and released on August 14, 2013.

Singles
"Más y Más": the album's first lead single, released on January 6, 2013. The highly anticipated duet between Draco Rosa and fellow ex-Menudo member and long-time friend Ricky Martin on "Más y Más" was released on iTunes weeks after Draco's quarantine expired and was declared cancer-free on December 31, 2012. "After so many years of writing and doing projects together, I felt that the right right thing was this should be the first single. Ricky is one of the main artists with whom I've worked with, so it was a great idea to do such a pretty duet. It's that kind of things that are destined to happen", said Draco. Although both artists have not seen each other in person for many years, Draco said Ricky was one of the many friends who gave him support in one of the most difficult stages of his cancer treatment. An urban version of the single was released exclusively on iTunes on February 25, 2013. Also an obscure version, which is only available in the Walmart Exclusive Bonus Track version of Vida. Promotion for this single and its music video was released on May 3, 2013.
"Esto Es Vida": on June 9, 2013, during the Puerto Rican Day Parade, Draco confirmed that his duet of "Esto Es Vida" with Dominican singer-songwriter Juan Luis Guerra will be the album's second single with its release taking place on June 25, 2013. The music video was filmed just a few days later in Santo Domingo. A bachata version of the duet was released on September 30, 2014.

Promotional singles

Personnel

 Marc Anthony – vocals
 Rubén Blades – vocals
 Enrique Bunbury – vocals, guitar
 Andrés Calamaro – vocals, guitar
 Tego Calderón – composer, vocals
 Dave Clauss – engineer
 Luis Gómez Escolar – composer
 Benny Faccone – mixing
 José Feliciano – vocals, guitar
 Juan Luis Guerra – vocals, guitar
 Seth Atkins Horan – engineer
 Nelson "Gazu" Jaime – engineer
 Juanes – vocals
 Allan Leschhorn – engineer
 Bob Ludwig – mastering
 Maná – vocals, guitar, bass, drums
 Ricky Martin – vocals
 MiMA – vocals
 Ednita Nazario – vocals
 George Noriega – producer
 René Pérez – vocals
 Fernando Quintana – engineer
 Draco Rosa – composer, vocals, producer
 Romeo Santos – vocals
 Alejandro Sanz – vocals
 Fabián Serrano – engineer
 Shakira – vocals
 Itaal Shur – composer
 Sadaharu Yagi – engineer

Concerts

Encuentro
On January 28, 2012, Draco made a comeback to the public eye after his long absence due to cancer treatment to announce a concert with Juan Luis Guerra and Rubén Blades. The concert took place on March 30, 2012 at the José Miguel Agrelot Coliseum. The concert was named "Encuentro" after the Banco Popular Christmas musical special of the same name that they starred and performed in 2002, nearly a decade prior. Angelo Medina, producer of the event, announced on February 24, 2012, that the concert was quickly sold-out and a second concert was added for March 31, 2013. Both concerts premiered two of the 16 tracks of Draco's Vida album. Guerra joined Draco in "Esto Es Vida" and then Blades with "El Tiempo Va" alongside Draco.

Draco & Friends
Draco returned to the stage on December 6, 2013 at the José Miguel Agrelot Coliseum with a concert entitled "Draco & Friends". Many artists who collaborated on Vida performed alongside Draco, including Juan Luis Guerra, Enrique Bunbury, Calle 13's René Pérez, Juanes and Ricky Martin. Draco announced that due to overwhelming demand, a second concert date was added for December 7, 2013, which featured other guest artists.

Awards

Chart performance

Weekly charts

Album certification

References

2013 albums
Draco Rosa albums
Latin Grammy Award winners for Album of the Year
Grammy Award for Best Latin Pop Album
Vocal duet albums
Albums produced by George Noriega